

See also